"Stop Messin' Round" is a song first recorded by English blues rock group Fleetwood Mac in 1968. It was written by the group's principal guitarist and singer Peter Green, with an additional credit for manager C.G. Adams. The song is an upbeat 12-bar blues shuffle and is representative of the group's early repertoire of conventional electric blues.  The lyrics deal with the common blues theme of the unfaithful lover and share elements with earlier songs.

"Stop Messin' Round" was first released in mid-1968 as the B-side of "Need Your Love So Bad", which appeared on the UK singles chart. A different take of the song was later used as the opening track on Fleetwood Mac's second UK and US albums. Music writers have viewed the song favourably, with Green's guitar work singled out as a highlight.  Other artists, such as Gary Moore and Aerosmith, have recorded renditions for their blues-inspired albums.

Lyrics
"Stop Messin' Round" is credited to Peter Green and C.G. Adams, Fleetwood Mac's manager, who also used the name Clifford Davis.  Only two of the song's 12-bar verses include vocals: the first uses the common call and response or AAB pattern, while the second includes four bars of stop-time, before concluding with the same refrain as the first:

In 1948, Detroit blues harp player and singer Walter Mitchell recorded the similarly titled "Stop Messin' Around" for J.V.B. Records.  Mitchell uses an AAB pattern, but includes a reference to a .44 caliber pistol.
Both songs use similar phrasing to the first eight bars of Sonny Boy Williamson I's 1945 adaptation of Robert Johnson's 1938 song "Stop Breakin' Down Blues". Johnson's song uses the refrain "Stop breakin' down, please stop breakin' down".

Recording and musical style
Fleetwood Mac recorded "Stop Messin' Round" at the CBS studio in London on 28 April 1968.  The core group—guitarist Green, bassist John McVie, and drummer Mick Fleetwood—were augmented by pianist (also future McVie wife and full-time group member) Christine Perfect, and saxophone players Steve Gregory and Johnny Almond.  Five takes were attempted: the first three were incomplete and the fourth yielded the master later included on the group's Mr. Wonderful album in 1968.  The fifth take was used for the single release.

In order to capture a sound more typical of live performances, a public address system (PA system) was used in the recording studio.  Producer Mike Vernon describes it as providing a "dirtier, gutsier soundcloser to that generated at a club performance" than a typical recording studio.  Multitracking, a common studio technique, was not used: "[T]here is a full density of sound that... is a result of having recorded the full band and guest musicians as one unit. No overdubs", he adds.  In a 1999 interview, Vernon singled out "Stop Messin' Round":

Fleetwood Mac biographer Donald Brackett describes the approach on Mr. Wonderful as "the straight goods in terms of gritty white blues within a traditional format" and the material as "pure scintillating blues, rough in form and raw in content".  Critic Richie Unterberger sees it as an attempt to emulate the sound of the Sun Studio in Memphis and Chess Studios in Chicago, where many of the classic electric blues songs were recorded.  However, he describes the overall album sound as "rushed, raw, and thin".

Chicken Shack co-founder and bassist Andy Silvester recalled Green as a perfectionist, who advised Fleetwood on his drum parts.  At Green's request, Silvester played Fleetwood a Jimmy Reed song: "[I played Reed's] 'My Bitter Seed', which just had this amazing groove to it: the tempo was really slow and yet it shuffled along with a lot of swing... it just flowed [but Fleetwood's drumming] already had that".  (Fleetwood later remarked: "Shuffles... I'm sick to death of fuckin' shuffles!")

The most prominent feature of "Stop Messin' Round" is Green's guitar work: only two 12-bar verses have vocals, the remaining four (album version) are devoted to Green's guitar soloing.  Author Douglas J. Noble points out that Green's early blues guitar style reflects "a fluid approach to phrasing", where his notes are slightly behind or ahead of the beat.  He adds "Green made great use of quarter tone bent notes", which is a feature of blues guitarists, such as B.B. King, to whom he was often compared.  Noble's transcription shows a tempo of 132 beats per minute (or allegro) in the key of C, which he describes as "a straight-forward medium tempo shuffle blues".  Green also uses both a C blues scale and C pentatonic major scale.

Releases
In mid-1968 in the UK, Blue Horizon released the 2:38 fifth take of "Stop Messin' Around" as the B-side to "Need Your Love So Bad", which was recorded during the same sessions.  The single reached number 31 on the UK Singles Chart on 23 July 1968.  Epic Records issued the single in the US, but it did not reach the record charts.  Subsequently, the shorter 2:18 fourth take of the song was added to Fleetwood Mac's second British album, Mr. Wonderful (1968) and their second American album, English Rose (1969).

The album version of the song usually appears on early compilations of Fleetwood Mac songs, such as The Pious Bird of Good Omen (1969), Black Magic Woman (1971), Greatest Hits (1971), and Vintage Years (1975).  The anniversary band retrospective boxed set 25 Years – The Chain (1992) includes it, along with eight other Green compositions.  The Mike Vernon produced The Complete Blue Horizon Sessions 1967–1969 (1999) has all five takes of the song.  A live recording by the BBC from 1 September 1968, shortly after Danny Kirwan joined the group, appears on Live at the BBC (1995).

Critical reception
"Stop Messin' Round" has received positive comments from music writers, with Green's guitar playing being singled out.  In a song review for AllMusic, critic Matthew Greenwald noted:

In a review of English Rose, critic Bruce Eder describes it as one of the songs "representing the stronger tracks" from Mr. Wonderful.  Richie Unterberger calls it "Mr. Wonderful's one gem" among the album's more derivative tunes.  In Legends of Rock Guitar: The Essential Reference of Rock's Greatest Guitarists, "Stop Messin' Round" is identified as one of six "guitar high points" in Peter Green's career.

Renditions

Irish guitarist Gary Moore recorded the song for his first blues album, Still Got the Blues (1990).  For a while, Moore owned Green's 1959 Gibson Les Paul, which Green frequently played with Fleetwood Mac and used to record many of the group's most well-known songs. Moore used the guitar to record his tribute album to Green, Blues for Greeny (1995), which features Fleetwood Mac-era compositions by Green.

Welsh guitarist and Savoy Brown co-founder Kim Simmonds recorded an acoustic ensemble version of the song, which appears on the tribute albums, Rattlesnake Guitar: The Music of Peter Green (1995) and Peter Green Songbook (2000). In a 1996 review for Cadence magazine, Bob Rusch describes it as "a surprisingly jazzy rendition".

American rock group Aerosmith recorded the song as "Stop Messin' Around" for their blues tribute album, Honkin' on Bobo (2004). Group guitarist Joe Perry provides the lead vocals, with Steven Tyler contributing the blues harp.  Perry later explained: "[Steven]'s not a technical player... He just lets it rip and he's great.  Ripping is what we do best." The two played the song during the "Tribute to the Blues" concert at the Radio City Music Hall in New York City in February 2003. Their performance is included as a bonus track on the DVD of Lightning in a Bottle, the 2004 concert documentary film by director Antoine Fuqua.

Footnotes

References

Bibliography

Songs written by Peter Green (musician)
1968 songs
1968 singles
Fleetwood Mac songs
Aerosmith songs
Gary Moore songs
Works published under a pseudonym
Song recordings produced by Mike Vernon (record producer)